Ramkali Sadh (ਰਾਮਕਲੀ ਸਦੁ) is a composition present in Guru Granth Sahib on ang 923/924, composed by Baba Sundar, in Ramkali Raga. The composition has 6 stanzas. Sadh literally means Call (ਸੱਦਾ).
This narration tells Sikh attitude towards physical death of a Gurmukh''. 
It also narrates events of succession of Gur Ram Das over Gur Amar Das.

Keso Gopal Pundit
Keso Gopal Pandit (ਕੇਸੋ ਗੋਪਾਲ ਪੰਡਿਤ) is a qualitative name used for a Sikh in Ramkali Sadu. Here Pundit is not singular but plural. Following is stanza where this name is present:

ਕੇਸੋ ਗੋਪਾਲ ਪੰਡਿਤ ਸਦਿਅਹੁ ਹਰਿ ਹਰਿ ਕਥਾ ਪੜਹਿ ਪੁਰਾਣੁ ਜੀਉ ॥

Traditional commentators thought it to be some historical person during time of Guru Amar Dass. However, linguistically, experts agree 'Keso Gopal Pandit' refers to a learned scholar (Pundit) who has extensive knowledge and wisdom.  In Gurmat, Gurmukhi have knowledge of Keso/Gopal. Others believe Guru Amar Das ji to be simply asking to invite 'such a learned scholar(s)', who can read the sermon of the eternal lord, har har.

References

External links
 Avtar Singh Raagi Singing a hymn of Ramkali Sadh

Adi Granth